Gregor Kobel (born 6 December 1997) is a Swiss professional footballer who plays as a goalkeeper for Bundesliga club Borussia Dortmund and the Switzerland national team.

Club career

Hoffenheim 
Kobel made his professional debut for 1899 Hoffenheim on 12 August 2018, starting in the first round of the 2017–18 DFB-Pokal against 3. Liga side Rot-Weiß Erfurt. The match finished as a 1–0 away win for Hoffenheim.

VfB Stuttgart 
For the 2019–20 season Kobel was loaned out to VfB Stuttgart. On 28 July 2020, Kobel moved permanently to VfB Stuttgart and signed a contract until June 2024.

Borussia Dortmund 
On 31 May 2021, Kobel signed a five-year contract with Borussia Dortmund ahead of the 2021–22 season. The transfer fee paid to VfB Stuttgart was 15 million euros.

International career 
Kobel was a youth international for Switzerland.
He was called up to the senior team for the first time on 2020.
In 2021 the national team for the 2020 UEFA European Championship, where the team created one of the main sensations of the tournament reaching the quarter-finals.

He made his debut on 1 September 2021 in a friendly against Greece, a 2–1 victory at home.

Career statistics

Club

International

References

External links
Profile at the Borussia Dortmund website
 

1997 births
Living people
Footballers from Zürich
Swiss men's footballers
Switzerland youth international footballers
Switzerland under-21 international footballers
Switzerland international footballers
Association football goalkeepers
FC Zürich players
Grasshopper Club Zürich players
TSG 1899 Hoffenheim II players
TSG 1899 Hoffenheim players
FC Augsburg players
VfB Stuttgart players
Borussia Dortmund players
Bundesliga players
2. Bundesliga players
Regionalliga players
UEFA Euro 2020 players
2022 FIFA World Cup players
Swiss expatriate footballers
Expatriate footballers in Germany
Swiss expatriate sportspeople in Germany